Santa Fe Township is a township in Pawnee County, Kansas, United States. As of the 2020 Census, it had a population of 184.

References

Further reading

External links
 Pawnee County maps: Current, Historic, KDOT

Townships in Pawnee County, Kansas
Townships in Kansas